Darnley Boxill (born 2 October 1944) is a Barbadian cricketer. A wicket-keeper, he played in 15 first-class matches for the Barbados cricket team from 1964 to 1972.

Boxill is an accountant. In the early 1990s he invented and developed a cricket scoring system that enabled computerised ball-by-ball analysis of each player's performances.

See also
 List of Barbadian representative cricketers

References

External links
 

1944 births
Living people
Barbadian cricketers
Barbados cricketers
People from Christ Church, Barbados
Cricket scorers